Lycastus or Lykastos was a town of ancient Crete, mentioned in the Catalogue of Ships in Homer's Iliad. Strabo says that it had entirely disappeared, having been conquered and destroyed by the Cnossians. According to Polybius the Lycastian district was afterwards wrested from Cnossus by the Gortynians, who gave it to the neighbouring town of Rhaucus.

Its site is located near modern Rokka.

References

Populated places in ancient Crete
Former populated places in Greece
Locations in the Iliad